WOR or wor may refer to:

 Wake-on-ring, in computer network terminology
 Water-to-oil ratio, in oil drilling
 WEPN-FM, a radio station (98.7 FM) licensed to New York, New York, United States, which used the call sign WOR-FM from 1948 to October 1972
 Wired OR, in Verilog semantics
 Wor, a traditional song and dance genre practiced on Biak, Indonesia
 WOR, the National Rail code for Worle railway station in North Somerset, UK
 WOR (AM), a radio station (710 AM) licensed to New York, New York, United States
 Worchestershire, county in England, Chapman code
 World Ocean Review, ocean and climate report from 2010
 Worthington Industries, stock ticker symbol
 WWOR-TV, a television station (channel 9) licensed to Secaucus, New Jersey, United States, which used the call sign WOR-TV from 1949 to April 1987

See also 
 
 
 Wore (disambiguation)